is an interchange passenger railway station in the city of Nagareyama, Chiba, Japan, operated jointly by the private railway operator Tōbu Railway (as an infill station) and the third-sector railway operating company Metropolitan Intercity Railway Company.

Lines
The station is served by the following two lines.
Tobu Urban Park Line
Tsukuba Express

Station layout
Nagareyama-ōtakanomori Station has two opposed side platforms at ground level for the Tobu Urban Park Line, connected by a footbridge to the elevated station building above. The Tsukuba Express has two elevated island platforms built at a right angle to the Tōbu Line platforms, built above the station building. A walkway form the station connects it to the Forest of Nagareyama shopping mall.

Platforms

Tobu

Metropolitan Intercity Railway

History
The station opened on 24 August 2005, coinciding with the opening of the Tsukuba Express line.

From 17 March 2012, station numbering was introduced on all Tōbu lines, with Nagareyama-ōtakanomori Station becoming "TD-22".

Passenger statistics
In fiscal 2018, the Tobu Railway portion of the station was used by an average of 58,635 passengers daily. The Tsukuba Express portion of the station was used by an average of 38,194 passengers (departing passengers only) during the same period.

Surrounding area
Edogawa University
Nagareyama-ōtakanomori Shopping Center
Nagareyama-ōtakanomori Post Office

See also
 List of railway stations in Japan

References

External links

 Tobu Railway Nagareyama-ōtakanomori Station 
 TX Nagareyama-ōtakanomori Station 

Stations of Tsukuba Express
Stations of Tobu Railway
Railway stations in Chiba Prefecture
Railway stations in Japan opened in 2005
Nagareyama